"Cinderella", or "The Little Glass Slipper", is a folk tale with thousands of variants throughout the world. The protagonist is a young woman living in forsaken circumstances that are suddenly changed to remarkable fortune, with her ascension to the throne via marriage. The story of Rhodopis, recounted by the Greek geographer Strabo sometime between 7 BC and AD 23, about a Greek slave girl who marries the king of Egypt, is usually considered to be the earliest known variant of the Cinderella story.

The first literary European version of the story was published in Italy by Giambattista Basile in his Pentamerone in 1634; the version that is now most widely known in the English-speaking world was published in French by Charles Perrault in Histoires ou contes du temps passé in 1697. Another version was later published as Aschenputtel by the Brothers Grimm in their folk tale collection Grimms' Fairy Tales in 1812.

Although the story's title and main character's name change in different languages, in English-language folklore Cinderella is an archetypal name. The word Cinderella has, by analogy, come to mean someone whose attributes are unrecognized, or someone unexpectedly achieves recognition or success after a period of obscurity and neglect. The still-popular story of Cinderella continues to influence popular culture internationally, lending plot elements, allusions, and tropes to a wide variety of media.

Ancient versions

European

Rhodopis

The oldest known oral version of the Cinderella story is the ancient Greek story of Rhodopis, a Greek courtesan living in the colony of Naucratis in Egypt, whose name means "Rosy-Cheeks". The story is first recorded by the Greek geographer Strabo in his Geographica (book 17, 33): "They [the Egyptians] tell the fabulous story that, when she was bathing, an eagle snatched one of her sandals from her maid and carried it to Memphis; and while the king was administering justice in the open air, the eagle, when it arrived above his head, flung the sandal into his lap; and the king, stirred both by the beautiful shape of the sandal and by the strangeness of the occurrence, sent men in all directions into the country in quest of the woman who wore the sandal; and when she was found in the city of Naucratis, she was brought up to Memphis, and became the wife of the king."

The same story is also later reported by the Roman orator Aelian (–) in his Miscellaneous History, which was written entirely in Greek. Aelian's story closely resembles the story told by Strabo, but adds that the name of the pharaoh in question was Psammetichus. Aelian's account indicates that the story of Rhodopis remained popular throughout antiquity.

Herodotus, some five centuries before Strabo, records a popular legend about a possibly related courtesan named Rhodopis in his Histories, claiming that she came from Thrace, was the slave of Iadmon of Samos and a fellow-slave of the story-teller Aesop, was taken to Egypt in the time of Pharaoh Amasis, and freed there for a large sum by Charaxus of Mytilene, brother of Sappho the lyric poet.

The resemblance of the shoe-testing of Rhodopis with Cinderella's slipper has already been noted in the 19th century, by Edgar Taylor and Reverend Sabine Baring-Gould.

Aspasia of Phocaea
A second predecessor for the Cinderella character, hailing from late Antiquity, may be Aspasia of Phocaea. Her story is told in Aelian's Varia Storia: lost her mother in early childhood and raised by her father, Aspasia, despite living in poverty, has dreamt of meeting a noble man. As she dozes off, the girl has a vision of a dove transforming into a woman, who instructs her on how to remove a physical imperfection and restore her own beauty. In another episode, she and other courtesans are made to attend a feast hosted by Persian regent Cyrus the Younger. During the banquet, the Persian King sets his sights on Aspasia herself and ignores the other women.

Le Fresne

The twelfth-century AD lai of Le Fresne ("The Ash-Tree Girl"), retold by Marie de France, is a variant of the "Cinderella" story in which a wealthy noblewoman abandons her infant daughter at the base of an ash tree outside a nunnery with a ring and brocade as tokens of her identity because she is one of twin sisters—the mother fears that she will be accused of infidelity (according to popular belief, twins were evidence of two different fathers). The infant is discovered by the porter, who names her Fresne, meaning "Ash Tree", and she is raised by the nuns. After she has attained maturity, a young nobleman sees her and becomes her lover. The nobleman, however, is forced to marry a woman of noble birth. Fresne accepts that she will never marry her beloved but waits in the wedding chamber as a handmaiden. She covers the bed with her own brocade but, unbeknownst to her, her beloved's bride is actually her twin sister, and her mother recognizes the brocade as the same one she had given to the daughter she had abandoned so many years before. Fresne's true parentage is revealed and, as a result of her noble birth, she is allowed to marry her beloved, while her twin sister is married to a different nobleman.

Ċiklemfusa from Malta
The Maltese Cinderella is named Ċiklemfusa. She is portrayed as an orphaned child in her early childhood. Before his death, her father gave her three magical objects: a chestnut, a nut and an almond. She used to work as a servant in the King's palace. Nobody ever took notice of the poor girl. One day she heard of a big ball and with the help of a magical spell turned herself into a beautiful princess. The prince fell in love with her and gave her a ring. On the following night the Prince gave her a diamond and on the third night he gave her a ring with a large gem on it. By the end of the ball Ċiklemfusa would run away hiding herself in the cellars of the Palace. She knew that the Prince was very sad about her disappearance so one day she made some krustini (typical Maltese biscuits) for him and hid the three gifts in each of them. When the Prince ate the biscuits he found the gifts he had given to the mysterious Princess and soon realized the huge mistake he had made of ignoring Ċiklemfusa because of her poor looks. They soon made marriage arrangements and she became his wife.

Outside Europe

Ye Xian
The tale of Ye Xian first appeared in Miscellaneous Morsels from Youyang written by Duan Chengshi around 860. In this version, Ye Xian is the daughter of the local tribal leader who died when she was young. Because her mother died before her father, she is now under the care of her father's second wife, who abused her. She befriends a fish, which is the reincarnation of her deceased mother. Her stepmother and half-sister kill the fish, but Ye Xian finds the bones, which are magical, and they help her dress appropriately for a local Festival, including a very light golden shoe. Her stepfamily recognizes her at the festival, causing her to flee and accidentally lose the shoe. Afterwards, the king of another sea island obtains the shoe and is curious about it as no one has feet that can fit the shoe. The King searches everywhere and finally reaches Ye's house, where she tries on the shoe. The king realises she is the one and takes her back to his kingdom. Her cruel stepmother and half-sister are killed by flying rocks. Variants of the story are also found in many ethnic groups in China.

Tam and Cam
The Story of Tam and Cam, from Vietnam, is similar to the Chinese version. The heroine Tấm also had a fish that was killed by the stepmother and the half-sister, and its bones also give her clothes. Later after marrying the king, Tấm was killed by her stepmother and sister, and reincarnated several times in form of a bird, a loom and a "gold apple". She finally reunited with the king and lived happily ever after.

Other Asian versions
There exists a Cambodian version (called "Khmer" by the collectors) with the name Néang Kantoc. Its collectors compared it to the Vietnamese story of Tam and Cam.

Another version was collected from the Cham people of Southeast Asia, with the name La Sandale d'Or ("The Golden Sandal") or Conte de demoiselles Hulek et Kjong ("The tale of the ladies Hulek and Kjong").

20th century folktale collector Kenichi Mizusawa published an analysis of Japanese variants of Cinderella, separating them into two types: "Nukabuku, Komebuku" (about rival step-sisters) and "Ubagawa" (about the heroine's disguise).

One Thousand and One Nights
Several different variants of the story appear in the medieval One Thousand and One Nights, also known as the Arabian Nights, including "The Second Shaykh's Story", "The Eldest Lady's Tale" and "Abdallah ibn Fadil and His Brothers", all dealing with the theme of a younger sibling harassed by two jealous elders. In some of these, the siblings are female, while in others, they are male. One of the tales, "Judar and His Brethren", departs from the happy endings of previous variants and reworks the plot to give it a tragic ending instead, with the younger brother being poisoned by his elder brothers.

Literary versions

The first European version written in prose was published in Naples, Italy, by Giambattista Basile, in his Pentamerone (1634). The story itself was set in the Kingdom of Naples, at that time the most important political and cultural center of Southern Italy and among the most influential capitals in Europe, and written in the Neapolitan dialect. It was later retold, along with other Basile tales, by Charles Perrault in Histoires ou contes du temps passé (1697), and by the Brothers Grimm in their folk tale collection Grimms' Fairy Tales (1812).

The name "Cenerentola" comes from the Italian word "cenere" (ash, cinder). It has to do with the fact that servants and scullions were usually soiled with ash at that time, because of their cleaning work and also because they had to live in cold basements so they usually tried to get warm by sitting close to the fireplace.

Cenerentola, by Basile
Giambattista Basile, a Neapolitan writer, soldier and government official, assembled a set of oral folk tales into a written collection titled Lo cunto de li cunti (The Story of Stories), or Pentamerone. It included the tale of Cenerentola, which features a wicked stepmother and evil stepsisters, magical transformations, a missing slipper, and a hunt by a monarch for the owner of the slipper. It was published posthumously in 1634.

Plot:
A prince has a daughter, Zezolla (tonnie) (the Cinderella figure), who is tended by a beloved governess. The governess, with Zezolla's help, persuades the prince to marry her. The governess then brings forward six daughters of her own, who abuse Zezolla (tonnie), and send her into the kitchen to work as a servant. The prince goes to the island of Sinia, meets a fairy who gives presents to his daughter, and brings back for her: a golden spade, a golden bucket, a silken napkin, and a date seedling. The girl cultivates the tree, and when the king hosts a ball, Zezolla appears dressed richly by a fairy living in the date tree. The king falls in love with her, but Zezolla runs away before he can find out who she is. Twice Zezolla escapes the king and his servants. The third time, the king's servant captures one of her slippers. The king invites all of the maidens in the land to a ball with a shoe-test, identifies Zezolla (tonnie) after the shoe jumps from his hand to her foot, and eventually marries her.

Cendrillon ou la petite pantoufle de verre, by Perrault

One of the most popular versions of Cinderella was written in French by Charles Perrault in 1697, under the name Cendrillon ou la petite pantoufle de verre. The popularity of his tale was due to his additions to the story, including the pumpkin, the fairy-godmother and the introduction of "glass" slippers.

Plot:
A wealthy widower marries a proud and haughty woman as his second wife. She has two daughters, who are equally vain and selfish. But the man also has a beautiful young daughter from his first wife, a girl of unparalleled kindness and sweet temper. The stepmother, jealous of the young girl because her good graces show up her own two daughter's faults, forces her into servitude, where the girl is made to work day and night doing menial chores. After her chores are done for the day, she curls up near the fireplace in an effort to stay warm. She often arises covered in ashes, giving rise to the mocking nickname "Cendrillon" (Cinderella) by her stepsisters. Cinderella bears the abuse patiently and does not tell her father, who would have scolded her.
One day, the prince invites all the people in the land to a royal ball. The two stepsisters gleefully plan their wardrobes for the ball, and taunt Cinderella by telling her that maids aren't invited to the ball.
As the two stepsisters and the stepmother depart to the ball, Cinderella cries in despair. Her Fairy godmother magically appears and immediately begins to transform Cinderella from house servant to the young lady she was by birth, all in the effort to get Cinderella to the ball. She turns a pumpkin into a golden carriage, mice into horses, a rat into a coachman, and lizards into footmen. She then turns Cinderella's rags into a beautiful jeweled gown, complete with a delicate pair of glass slippers. The Fairy Godmother tells her to enjoy the ball, but warns her that she must return before midnight, when the spells will be broken.
At the ball, the entire court is entranced by Cinderella, especially the Prince. At this first ball, Cinderella remembers to leave before midnight. Back home, Cinderella graciously thanks her Fairy Godmother. She then innocently greets the two stepsisters, who had not recognized her earlier, and talk of nothing but the beautiful girl at the ball.
Another ball is held the next evening, and Cinderella again attends with her Fairy Godmother's help. The prince has become even more infatuated with the mysterious woman at the ball, and Cinderella in turn becomes so enchanted by him she loses track of time and leaves only at the final stroke of midnight, losing one of her glass slippers on the steps of the palace in her haste. The Prince chases her, but outside the palace, the guards see only a simple country girl leave. The prince pockets the slipper and vows to find and marry the girl to whom it belongs. Meanwhile, Cinderella keeps the other slipper, which does not disappear when the spell is broken.
The prince's herald tries the slipper on all the women in the kingdom. When the herald arrives at Cinderella's home, the two stepsisters try in vain to win him over. Cinderella asks if she may try, but the two stepsisters taunt her. Naturally, the slipper fits perfectly, and Cinderella produces the other slipper for good measure. Cinderella's stepfamily pleads for forgiveness, and Cinderella agrees. Cinderella had hoped her step-family would love her always. Cinderella marries the prince and forgives her two stepsisters, then marrying them off to two wealthy noblemen of the court. They all lived happily ever after.

The first moral of the story is that beauty is a treasure, but graciousness is priceless. Without it, nothing is possible; with it, one can do anything.

However, the second moral of the story mitigates the first one and reveals the criticism that Perrault is aiming at: That "without doubt it is a great advantage to have intelligence, courage, good breeding, and common sense. These, and similar talents come only from heaven, and it is good to have them. However, even these may fail to bring you success, without the blessing of a godfather or a godmother."

Aschenputtel, by the Brothers Grimm
Another well-known version was recorded by the German brothers Jacob and Wilhelm Grimm in the 19th century. The tale is called "Aschenputtel" [“The Little Ash Girl”] or "Cinderella" in English translations). This version is much more violent than that of Charles Perrault and Disney, in that Cinderella's father has not died and the two stepsisters mutilate their feet to fit in the golden slipper. There is no fairy godmother in this version of the Brothers Grimm, but rather help comes from a wishing tree that the heroine planted on her deceased mother's grave when she recites a certain chant. In the second edition of their collection (1819), the Brothers Grimm supplemented the original 1812 version with a coda in which the two stepsisters suffer a terrible punishment by the princess Cinderella for their cruelty.

Summary
A wealthy gentleman's wife falls gravely ill, and as she lies on her deathbed, she calls for her only daughter, and tells her to remain good and kind, as God would protect her. She then dies and is buried. The child visits her mother's grave every day to grieve and a year goes by. The gentleman marries another woman with two older daughters from a previous marriage. They have beautiful faces and fair skin, but their hearts are cruel and wicked. The stepsisters steal the girl's fine clothes and jewels and force her to wear rags. They banish her into the kitchen, and give her the nickname "Aschenputtel" ("Ashfool"). She is forced to do all kinds of hard work from dawn to dusk for the sisters. The cruel sisters do nothing but mock her and make her chores harder by creating messes. However, despite all of it, the girl remains good and kind, and regularly visits her mother's grave to cry and pray to God that she will see her circumstances improve.

One day the gentleman visits a fair, promising his stepdaughters gifts of luxury. The eldest asks for beautiful dresses, while the younger for pearls and diamonds. His own daughter merely begs for the first twig to knock his hat off on the way. The gentleman goes on his way, and acquires presents for his stepdaughters. While passing a forest he gets a hazel twig, and gives it to his daughter. She plants the twig over her mother's grave, waters it with her tears and over the years, it grows into a glowing hazel tree. The girl prays under it three times a day, and a white bird always comes to her as she prays. She tells her wishes to the bird, and every time the bird throws down to her what she has wished for.

The king decides to proclaim a festival that will last for three days and invites all the beautiful maidens in that country to attend so that the prince can select one of them for his bride. The two sisters are also invited, but when Aschenputtel begs them to allow her to go with them into the celebration, the stepmother refuses because she has no decent dress nor shoes to wear. When the girl insists, the woman throws a dish of lentils into the ashes for her to pick up, guaranteeing her permission to attend the festival if she can clean up the lentils in two hours. When the girl accomplished the task in less than an hour with the help of a flock of white doves that came when she sang a certain chant, the stepmother only redoubles the task and throws down even a greater quantity of lentils. When Aschenputtel is able to accomplish it in a greater speed, not wanting to spoil her daughters' chances, the stepmother hastens away with her husband and daughters to the celebration and leaves the crying stepdaughter behind.

The girl retreats to the graveyard and asks to be clothed in silver and gold. The white bird drops a gold and silver gown and silk shoes. She goes to the feast. The prince dances with her all the time, claiming her as his dance partner whenever a gentleman asks for her hand, and when sunset comes she asks to leave. The prince escorts her home, but she eludes him and jumps inside the estate's pigeon coop. The father came home ahead of time and the prince asks him to chop the pigeon coop down, but Aschenputtel has already escaped from the back, to the graveyard to the hazel tree to return her fine clothes. The father finds her asleep in the kitchen hearth, and suspects nothing. The next day, the girl appears in grander apparel. The prince again dances with her the whole day, and when dark came, the prince accompanies her home. However, she climbs a pear tree in the back garden to escape him. The prince calls her father who chops down the tree, wondering if it could be Aschenputtel, but Aschenputtel was already in the kitchen when the father arrives home. The third day, she appears dressed in grand finery, with slippers of gold. Now the prince is determined to keep her, and has the entire stairway smeared with pitch. Aschenputtel, in her haste to elude the prince, loses one of her golden slippers on that pitch. The prince picks the slipper and proclaims that he will marry the maiden whose foot fits the golden slipper.

The next morning, the prince goes to Aschenputtel's house and tries the slipper on the eldest stepsister. Since she will have no more need to go on foot when she will be queen, the sister was advised by her mother to cut off her toes to fit the slipper. While riding with the stepsister, the two magic doves from heaven tell the prince that blood drips from her foot. Appalled by her treachery, he goes back again and tries the slipper on the other stepsister. She cut off part of her heel to get her foot in the slipper, and again the prince is fooled. While riding with her to the king's castle, the doves alert him again about the blood on her foot. He comes back to inquire about another girl. The gentleman tells him that his dead wife left a "dirty little Cinderella" in the house, omitting to mention that she is his own daughter, and that she is too filthy to be seen, but the prince asks him to let her try on the slipper. Aschenputtel appears after washing clean her face and hands, and when she puts on the slipper, which fitted her like a glove, the prince recognizes her as the stranger with whom he has danced at the festival, even before trying it. To the horror of the stepmother and the two limping sisters, their merely servant-girl had won without any subterfuge. The prince put Aschenputtel before him on his horse and rode off to the palace. While passing the hazel tree the two magic doves from heaven declare Aschenputtel as the true bride of the prince, and remained on her shoulders, one on the left and the other on the right.

In a coda added in the second edition of 1819, during Aschenputtel's royal wedding, the false stepsisters had hoped to worm their way into her favour as the future queen, but this time they don't escape their princess' silent rage, which she kept to herself until that day. As she walks down the aisle with her stepsisters as her bridesmaids, Aschenputtel's doves fly off her shoulders and strike the two stepsisters' eyes, one in the left and the other in the right. It is their last chance of redemption, but since they are desperate to win the new princess' affections, they don't give up and go through the ceremony, so when the wedding comes to an end, and Aschenputtel and her beloved prince march out of the church, her doves fly again, promptly striking the remaining eyes of the two evil stepsisters blind, a truly awful comeuppance they have to endure. Then, finally free from abuse and enslavement, Aschenputtel leaves her family forever to be a princess with her prince, while the stepsisters live their lives in blinding, as her father and stepmother are in disgrace.

Plot variations and alternative tellings

Folklorists have long studied variants on this tale across cultures. In 1893, Marian Roalfe Cox, commissioned by the Folklore Society of Britain, produced Cinderella: Three Hundred and Forty-Five Variants of Cinderella, Catskin and, Cap o'Rushes, Abstracted and Tabulated with a Discussion of Medieval Analogues and Notes. Further morphology studies have continued on this seminal work.

Joseph Jacobs has attempted to reconstruct the original tale as The Cinder Maid by comparing the common features among hundreds of variants collected across Europe. The Aarne–Thompson–Uther system classifies Cinderella as type 510A, "Persecuted Heroine". Others of this type include The Sharp Grey Sheep; The Golden Slipper; The Story of Tam and Cam; Rushen Coatie; The Wonderful Birch; Fair, Brown and Trembling; and Katie Woodencloak.

The magical help
International versions lack the fairy godmother present in the famous Perrault's tale. Instead, the donor is her mother, incarnated into an animal (if she is dead) or transformed into a cow (if alive). In other versions, the helper is an animal, such as a cow, a bull, a pike, or a saint or angel. The bovine helper appears in some Greek versions, in "the Balkan-Slavonic tradition of the tale", and in some Central Asian variants. The mother-as-cow is killed by the heroine's sisters, her bones gathered and from her grave the heroine gets the wonderful dresses.

Africanist Sigrid Schmidt stated that "a typical scene" in Kapmalaien (Cape Malays) tales is the mother becoming a fish, being eaten in fish form, the daughter burying her bones and a tree sprouting from her grave.

Professor Gražina Skabeikytė-Kazlauskienė recognizes that the fish, the cow, even a female dog (in other variants), these animals represent "the [heroine's] mother's legacy". Jack Zipes, commenting on a Sicilian variant, concluded much the same: Cinderella is helped by her mother "in the guise of doves, fairies, and godmothers". In his notes to his own reconstruction, Joseph Jacobs acknowledged that the heroine's animal helper (e.g., cow or sheep) was "clearly identified with her mother", as well as the tree on Cinderella's mother's grave was connected to her.

Villains
Although many variants of Cinderella feature the wicked stepmother, the defining trait of type 510A is a female persecutor: in Fair, Brown and Trembling and Finette Cendron, the stepmother does not appear at all, and it is the older sisters who confine her to the kitchen. In other fairy tales featuring the ball, she was driven from home by the persecutions of her father, usually because he wished to marry her. Of this type (510B) are Cap O' Rushes, Catskin, All-Kinds-of-Fur, and Allerleirauh, and she slaves in the kitchen because she found a job there. In Katie Woodencloak, the stepmother drives her from home, and she likewise finds such a job.

In La Cenerentola, Gioachino Rossini inverted the sex roles: Cenerentola is mistreated by her stepfather. (This makes the opera Aarne-Thompson type 510B.) He also made the economic basis for such hostility unusually clear, in that Don Magnifico wishes to make his own daughters' dowries larger, to attract a grander match, which is impossible if he must provide a third dowry. Folklorists often interpret the hostility between the stepmother and stepdaughter as just such a competition for resources, but seldom does the tale make it clear.

In some retellings, at least one stepsister is somewhat kind to Cinderella and second guesses the Stepmother's treatment. This is seen in Ever After, the two direct-to-video sequels to Walt Disney's 1950 film, and the 2013 Broadway musical.

Ball, ballgown, and curfew
The number of balls varies, sometimes one, sometimes two, and sometimes three. The fairy godmother is Perrault's own addition to the tale. The person who aided Cinderella (Aschenputtel) in the Grimms's version is her dead mother. Aschenputtel requests her aid by praying at her grave, on which a tree is growing. Helpful doves roosting in the tree shake down the clothing she needs for the ball. This motif is found in other variants of the tale as well, such as in the Finnish The Wonderful Birch. Playwright James Lapine incorporated this motif into the Cinderella plotline of the musical Into the Woods. Giambattista Basile's Cenerentola combined them; the Cinderella figure, Zezolla, asks her father to commend her to the Dove of Fairies and ask her to send her something, and she receives a tree that will provide her clothing. Other variants have her helped by talking animals, as in Katie Woodencloak, Rushen Coatie, Bawang Putih Bawang Merah, The Story of Tam and Cam, or The Sharp Grey Sheep—these animals often having some connection with her dead mother; in The Golden Slipper, a fish aids her after she puts it in water. In "The Anklet", it's a magical alabaster pot the girl purchased with her own money that brings her the gowns and the anklets she wears to the ball. Gioachino Rossini, having agreed to do an opera based on Cinderella if he could omit all magical elements, wrote La Cenerentola, in which she was aided by Alidoro, a philosopher and formerly the Prince's tutor.

The midnight curfew is also absent in many versions; Cinderella leaves the ball to get home before her stepmother and stepsisters, or she is simply tired. In the Grimms' version, Aschenputtel slips away when she is tired, hiding on her father's estate in a tree, and then the pigeon coop, to elude her pursuers; her father tries to catch her by chopping them down, but she escapes.

Identifying item

The glass slipper is unique to Charles Perrault's version and its derivatives; in other versions of the tale it may be made of other materials (in the version recorded by the Brothers Grimm, German: Aschenbroedel and Aschenputtel, for instance, it is gold) and in still other tellings, it is not a slipper but an anklet, a ring, or a bracelet that gives the prince the key to Cinderella's identity. In Rossini's opera "La Cenerentola" ("Cinderella"), the slipper is replaced by twin bracelets to prove her identity. In the Finnish variant The Wonderful Birch the prince uses tar to gain something every ball, and so has a ring, a circlet, and a pair of slippers. Some interpreters, perhaps troubled by sartorial impracticalities, have suggested that Perrault's "glass slipper" (pantoufle de verre) had been a "squirrel fur slipper" (pantoufle de vair) in some unidentified earlier version of the tale, and that Perrault or one of his sources confused the words.  However, most scholars believe the glass slipper was a deliberate piece of poetic invention on Perrault's part.   Nabokov has Professor Pnin assert as fact that "Cendrillon's shoes were not made of glass but of Russian squirrel fur – vair, in French". The 1950 Disney adaptation takes advantage of the slipper being made of glass to add a twist whereby the slipper is shattered just before Cinderella has the chance to try it on, leaving her with only the matching slipper with which to prove her identity.

Revelation
In many variants of the tale, the prince is told that Cinderella can not possibly be the one, as she is too dirty and ragged. Often, this is said by the stepmother or stepsisters. In the Grimms' version, both the stepmother and the father urge it. The prince nevertheless insists on her trying. Cinderella arrives and proves her identity by fitting into the slipper or other item (in some cases she has kept the other).

Conclusion
According to Korean scholarship, East Asian versions of Cinderella "typically" continue as the heroine's stepmother replaces the Cinderella-like character for her own daughter, while the heroine goes through a cycle of transformations. Such tales continue the fairy tale into what is in effect a second episode.

In The Thousand Nights and A Night, in a tale called "The Anklet", the stepsisters make a comeback by using twelve magical hairpins to turn the bride into a dove on her wedding night. In The Wonderful Birch, the stepmother, a witch, manages to substitute her daughter for the true bride after she has given birth.

Works based on the Cinderella story
Works based on the story of Cinderella include:

Opera and ballet

Cendrillon (1749) by Jean-Louis Laruette
Cendrillon (1810) by Nicolas Isouard, libretto by Charles-Guillaume Étienne
 (1814) by Stefano Pavesi
La Cenerentola (1817) by Gioachino Rossini
Cinderella (1893) by Baron Boris Vietinghoff-Scheel
Cendrillon (1894–95) by Jules Massenet, libretto by Henri Caïn
Aschenbrödel (1901) by Johann Strauss II, adapted and completed by Josef Bayer
Cinderella (1901–02) by Gustav Holst
La Cenerentola (1902) by Ermanno Wolf-Ferrari
Cendrillon (1904) by Pauline García-Viardot
Aschenbrödel (1905) by Leo Blech, libretto by Richard Batka
Das Märchen vom Aschenbrödel (1941) by Frank Martin
Zolushka or Cinderella (1945) by Sergei Prokofiev
La Cenicienta (1966) by Jorge Peña Hen
Cinderella, a "pantomime opera" (1979) by Peter Maxwell Davies
Cinderella (1980) by Paul Reade
Cinderella (1997) by Matthew Bourne taking place in 1940 London using the music of Sergei Prokofiev
My First Cinderella (2013) directed by George Williamson and Loipa Araújo

Theatre

In 1804 Cinderella was presented at Drury Lane Theatre, London, described as "A new Grand Allegorical Pantomimic Spectacle" though it was very far in style and content from the modern pantomime. However, it included notable clown Joseph Grimaldi playing the part of a servant called Pedro, the antecedent of today's character Buttons. In 1820 Harlequin and Cinderella at the Theatre Royal, Covent Garden had much of the modern story (taken from the opera La Cenerentola) by Rossini but was a Harlequinade again featuring Grimaldi. In 1830 Rophino Lacy used Rossini's music but with spoken dialogue in a comic opera with many of the main characters: the Baron, the two stepsisters and Pedro the servant all as comic characters, plus a Fairy Queen instead of a magician. However it was the conversion of this via burlesque and rhyming couplets by Henry Byron that led to what was effectively the modern pantomime in both story and style at the Royal Strand Theatre in 1860: Cinderella! Or the Lover, the Lackey, and the Little Glass Slipper.

In the traditional pantomime version the opening scene takes place in a forest with a hunt in progress; here Cinderella first meets Prince Charming and his "right-hand man" Dandini, whose name and character come from Gioachino Rossini's opera (La Cenerentola). Cinderella mistakes Dandini for the Prince and the Prince for Dandini. Her father, Baron Hardup, is under the thumb of his two stepdaughters, the Ugly sisters, and has a servant, Cinderella's friend Buttons. (Throughout the pantomime, the Baron is continually harassed by the Broker's Men (often named after current politicians) for outstanding rent. The Fairy Godmother must magically create a coach (from a pumpkin), footmen (from mice), a coach driver (from a frog), and a beautiful dress (from rags) for Cinderella to go to the ball. However, she must return by midnight, as it is then that the spell ceases.

Musicals
Cinderella by Rodgers and Hammerstein was produced for television three times and staged live in various productions. A version ran in 1958 at the London Coliseum with a cast including Tommy Steele, Yana, Jimmy Edwards, Kenneth Williams and Betty Marsden. This version was augmented with several other Rodgers and Hammerstein's songs plus a song written by Tommy Steele, "You and Me". In 2013, a Broadway production opened, with a new book by Douglas Carter Beane, and ran for 770 performances. In the acclaimed 2022 VTT production of Cinderella, Naomi Infeld will be playing Anastasia. 
Mr. Cinders, a musical, opened at the Adelphi Theatre, London in 1929 and received a film version in 1934.
Cindy, a 1964 Off-Broadway musical, was composed by Johnny Brandon and has had many revivals.
Into the Woods, a musical with music and lyrics by Stephen Sondheim and book by James Lapine, includes Cinderella as one of the many fairy-tale characters in the plot. This is partly based on the Grimm Brothers' version of "Cinderella", including the enchanted birds, mother's grave, three balls, and mutilation and blinding of the stepsisters. It opened on Broadway in 1987 and has had many revivals. In this show, Cinderella is actually the Baker's ex-sister-in-law, since she married her prince and her prince's brother married Rapunzel, and the baker is Rapunzel's brother. After she divorced the prince she became Rapunzel and the Baker's ex-sister-in-law.
Cinderella is a musical composed by Andrew Lloyd Webber that premiered in the West End in 2021.

Films and television
Over the decades, hundreds of films have been made that are either direct adaptations from Cinderella or have plots loosely based on the story.

Animation

Aschenputtel (1922), a silhouette shadow play short by Lotte Reiniger. The short silent film uses exaggerated figures and has no background, which creates a stark look. The film shows Aschenputtel's step-sisters graphically hacking their feet off to fit into the glass slipper.
Cinderella (1922), an animated Laugh-O-Gram produced by Walt Disney, first released on 6 December 1922. This film was about seven and half minutes long.
Cinderella (1925), an animated short film directed by Walter Lantz, produced by Bray Studios Inc.
A Kick for Cinderella (1925), an animated short film directed by Bud Fisher, in the Mutt and Jeff series of comic strip adaptations.
Cinderella Blues (1931), a Van Beuren animated short film featuring a feline version of the Cinderella character.
Poor Cinderella (1934), Fleischer Studios' first color cartoon and only appearance of Betty Boop in color during the Fleischer era.
A Coach for Cinderella (1937) – Jam Handy, Chevrolet advert
A Ride for Cinderella (1937) – Jam Handy, Chevrolet advert
Cinderella Meets Fella (1938), a Merrie Melodies animated short film featuring Egghead, the character who would eventually evolve into Elmer Fudd, as Prince Charming.
Cinderella (1950), a Walt Disney animated feature released on 15 February 1950, now considered one of Disney's classics as well as the most well-known film adaptation, including incorporating the titular character as a Disney Princess and its franchise.
Cinderella II: Dreams Come True (2002), a direct-to-video sequel to the 1950 film.
Cinderella III: A Twist in Time (2007), another direct-to-video sequel to the previous film. 
Ancient Fistory (1953) a Popeye parody animated short film.
Señorella and the Glass Huarache (1964), a Looney Tunes animated short film that transplants the story to a Mexican setting.
Festival of Family Classics (1972-73), episode Cinderella, produced by Rankin/Bass and animated by Mushi Production.
World Famous Fairy Tale Series (Sekai meisaku dōwa) (1975-83) has a 9-minute adaptation.
Manga Sekai Mukashi Banashi (1976-79), 10-minute adaptation.
Cinderella (1979), an animated short film based on Charles Perrault's version of the fairy tale. It was produced by the Soyuzmultfilm studio.
"Cinderella? Cinderella!" (1986), an episode of Alvin & the Chipmunks. With Brittany of The Chipettes playing the role of Cinderella and Alvin playing the role of Prince Charming.
My Favorite Fairy Tales (Sekai Dōwa Anime Zenshū) (1986), an anime television anthology, has a 12-minute adaptation.
Grimm's Fairy Tale Classics (1987-89) an anime television series based on Grimm's stories, as two half-hour episodes.
Funky Fables (Ponkikki Meisaku World) (1988-90), features an adaptation of Cinderella.
Britannica's Tales Around the World (1990-91), features Perrault's Cinderella along with two other variants of the story.
Cinderella (1994), a Japanese-American direct-to-video film by Jetlag Productions.
World Fairy Tale Series (Anime sekai no dōwa) (1995), anime television anthology produced by Toei Animation, has half-hour adaptation.
Cinderella Monogatari (The Story of Cinderella) (1996), anime television series produced by Tatsunoko Production.
 Cendrillon au Far West (2012), French/Belgian film set in the wild western age, written and directed by Pascal Hérold
Cinderella and the Secret Prince (2018), American animated film directed by Lynne Southerland.
Cinderella the Cat (2017), Italian animated film directed by Alessandro Rak

Non-English language live-action films and TV

Cinderella (1899), the first film version, produced in France by Georges Méliès, as "Cendrillon".
Mamele (1938) a Molly Picon vehicle made by the prewar Warsaw Yiddish film industry taking place in contemporary Lodz.
Cinderella (1947), a Soviet film based on the screenplay by Evgeny Schwartz, with Yanina Zhejmo in the leading role. Shot in black-and-white, it was colorized in 2009.
Cinderella (1955), German film
Sandalyas ni Zafira (1965), a Filipino fantasy film partially based on Cinderella and starring Lyn D'Amour as Princess Zafira
Sinderella Kül Kedisi (1971), a Turkish fantasy film based on Cinderella and starring Zeynep Değirmencioğlu as Cinderella.
Three Wishes for Cinderella (Tři oříšky pro Popelku) (1973), a Czechoslovakian/East German fairy tale film starring Libuše Šafránková as Cinderella and Pavel Trávníček as Prince. Frequently shown, especially at Christmas time, in several European countries.
Rani Aur Lalpari, a 1975 Indian children's fantasy film by Ravikant Nagaich features Cinderella as one of the characters - where she is portrayed by Neetu Singh.
Cinderella 4×4. Everything starts with desire (Zolushka 4x4. Vsyo nachinayetsya s zhelaniy) (2008), a Russian modernization featuring Darya Melnikova
Cinderella (2006), a Korean horror film 
Cinderella's Stepsister (2010), a Korean television series
, a German film
, another German film
Aik Nayee Cinderella (2013), a Pakistani modernization serial aired on Geo TV featuring Maya Ali and Osman Khalid Butt

English language live-action feature films

Cinderella (1911) silent film starring Florence La Badie
Cinderella (1914), a silent film starring Mary Pickford
The Glass Slipper (1955), feature film with Leslie Caron and Michael Wilding
The Slipper and the Rose (1976), a British Sherman Brothers musical film starring Gemma Craven and Richard Chamberlain.
Into the Woods (2014), a live-action fairy-tale-themed adaptation of the above-mentioned homonymous musical, in which Anna Kendrick's Cinderella is a central character.
Cinderella (2015), a live-action retelling of the 1950 animated Disney film starring Lily James as Cinderella, Cate Blanchett as Lady Tremaine, Cinderella's stepmother, Richard Madden as Kit/Prince Charming and Helena Bonham Carter as the Fairy Godmother. It is essentially a live-action reimagining of the 1950 animated film.
Cinderella (2021), a live-action film musical starring Camila Cabello as Cinderella, Idina Menzel as Cinderella's stepmother, Nicholas Galitzine as the Prince, and Billy Porter as the Fairy Godmother.

Modernizations and parodies
Ella Cinders (1926), a modern tale starring Colleen Moore, based on a comic strip by William M. Conselman and Charles Plumb, inspired by Charles Perrault's version.
First Love (1939), a musical modernization with Deanna Durbin and Robert Stack.
Cinderfella (1960), Cinderfella's (Jerry Lewis) fairy godfather (Ed Wynn) helps him escape from his wicked stepmother (Judith Anderson) and stepbrothers.
Ever After (1998), starring Drew Barrymore, a post-feminist, historical fiction take on the Cinderella story.
Ella Enchanted (2004), a fantasy retelling featuring Anne Hathaway, which is based on the 1997 novel of the same name.
A Cinderella Story (2004), a modernization featuring Hilary Duff and Chad Michael Murray
Another Cinderella Story (2008), a modernization featuring Selena Gomez and Drew Seeley
A Cinderella Story: Once Upon a Song (2011), a modernization featuring Lucy Hale and Freddie Stroma
A Cinderella Story: If the Shoe Fits (2016), a modernization featuring Sofia Carson and Thomas Law
A Cinderella Story: Christmas Wish (2019), a modernization featuring Laura Marano and Gregg Sulkin
A Cinderella Story: Starstruck (2021), a modernization featuring Bailee Madison and Michael Evans Behling
Elle: A Modern Cinderella Tale (2010), a modernization featuring Ashlee Hewitt and Sterling Knight
Sneakerella (2022), a modernization featuring Elizabeth Allen Rosenbaum

English language live-action TV films and series
Cinderella (1957), a musical adaptation by Rodgers and Hammerstein written for television and starring Julie Andrews as Cinderella, featuring Jon Cypher, Kaye Ballard, Alice Ghostley, and Edie Adams (originally broadcast in color, but only black-and-white kinescopes survive).
Cinderella (1965), a second production of the Rodgers and Hammerstein musical, starring 18-year-old Lesley Ann Warren in the leading role, and featuring Stuart Damon as the Prince, with Ginger Rogers, Walter Pidgeon, and Celeste Holm (filmed in color and broadcast annually for 10 years).
Hey, Cinderella! (1969), a television adaptation featuring The Muppets.
Cindy (1978), This version of the Cinderella tale with an all-black cast has Cinderella, who wants to marry a dashing army officer, finding out that her father, who she thought had an important job at a big hotel, is actually the men's room attendant. Her wicked stepmother finds out, too, and complications ensue. Starred Charlayne Woodard.
In 1985, Shelley Duvall produced a version of the story for Faerie Tale Theatre.
The Charmings (1987), a spoof of Cinderella appears in the episode "Cindy's Back In Town" where Cinderella, portrayed by Kim Johnston Ulrich, makes a play for Snow White's husband Prince Charming.
Into the Woods (1989), a film of the original 1987 Broadway production of the Stephen Sondheim musical.
Cinderella (1997), third production of the Rodgers and Hammerstein musical, this time starring Brandy as Cinderella, Whitney Houston as the Fairy Godmother, Bernadette Peters as Cinderella's evil stepmother, Jason Alexander as Lionel the valet and Whoopi Goldberg as the Queen. Remake of the 1957 and 1965 TV films.
Cinderella, a British TV modernization featuring Marcella Plunkett as Cinderella, Kathleen Turner as the stepmother and Jane Birkin as the fairy godmother.
The 10th Kingdom (2000) is a TV miniseries featuring Cinderella as a major character.
Confessions of an Ugly Stepsister (2002),  TV movie for The Wonderful World of Disney by writer Gene Quintano and director Gavin Millar, based on the book of the same name, focusing on the point of view of one of the step-sister
Once Upon a Time (2011), features Cinderella as a recurring character, played by Jessy Schram who made a deal with Rumplestiltskin who killed her fairy godmother right in front of her. In 2016, more of the story is shown in which Ashley, Cinderella's real-world counterpart, discovers her stepsister wanted to marry the footman rather than the prince. A different Cinderella in season 7, played by Dania Ramirez, went to the ball to kill the prince, not meet him.

Television parodies and modernizations
The story was retold as part of the episode "Grimm Job" of the American animated TV series Family Guy (season 12, episode 10), with Lois as Cinderella, Peter as Prince Charming, Mayor West as the fairy godmother, Lois's mother as the wicked step-mother, and Meg and Stewie as the step-sisters.
Rags (2012), a TV musical gender switched inversion of the Cinderella story that stars Keke Palmer and Max Schneider.
Sesame Street special "Cinderelmo" and the Magic Adventures of Mumfie episode "Scarecrowella" both feature a male protagonist playing the Cinderella role.
The My Little Pony first season finale "The Best Night Ever" parodies several key parts of the Cinderella story.
 In Carry On Christmas (1969), which was one of the Carry On Christmas Specials on TV, there is a sketch spoofing the Cinderella story. Barbara Windsor plays Cinderella and Terry Scott and Peter Butterworth play the ugly stepsisters.

Books

Cinderella (1697), Charles Perrault
Cinderella (1919), Charles S. Evans and illustrated by Arthur Rackham 
Ella Enchanted (1997), by Gail Carson Levine
Raisel's Riddle (1999), Erica Silverman and illustrated by Susan Gaber
Confessions of an Ugly Stepsister (1999), by Gregory Maguire
Just Ella (1999), by Margaret Peterson Haddix
Adelita: A Mexican Cinderella Story (2004), Tomie dePaola
"Princess of Glass" (2010) by Jessica Day George is loosely based on the fairytale.
Cinder (2012) by Marissa Meyer, a sci-fi retelling of the classic story
The Stepsister's Tale (2014) by Tracy Barrett
Geekerella (2017) by Ashley Poston
Stepsister (2019) by Jennifer Donnelly 
So This Is Love: A Twisted Tale (2020) by Elizabeth Lim
Cinderella is Dead (2020), by Kalynn Bayron

Video games 
 Yakuza 0, referenced in Goro Majima's song 24-Hour Cinderella.
 Persona 5 Royal, where Kasumi's Persona is based on Cinderella and named after her French translation, Cendrillon.

See also

 Rhodopis
 Eteriani
 Cinderella complex
 Cinderella effect
 Marriage plot
 Ye Xian
 Bawang Merah Bawang Putih

Footnotes

References
Notes

Further reading

  Accessed July 12, 2021.
Čechová, Mariana. "RHIZOMATIC CHARACTER OF TRANS-CULTURAL AND TRANS-TEMPORAL MODE OF LITERARY COMMUNICATION". In: World Literature Studies Vol. 6 (23), n. 3 (2014): 111–127.
  Accessed 17 November 2020.
  Accessed 7 May 2021.

  Accessed 5 July 2020.
 
 .
  Accessed June 25, 2021.
  Accessed June 25, 2021. 
 
 
 
 Albano Maria Luisa (a cura). Cenerentole in viaggio. Illustrazione di Marcella Brancaforte. Falzea Editore, Reggio Calabria, 2008.

Notes

External links

 
Project Gutenberg compilation, including original Cendrillon
Photos and illustrations from early Cinderella stage versions, including one with Ellaline Terriss and one with Phyllis Dare
Parallel German-English text of brothers Grimm's version in ParallelBook format
The Cinderella Bibliography by the University of Rochester
Folktales of ATU type 510A, "The Persecuted Heroine: Cinderella" by D. L. Ashliman

 
European fairy tales
European folklore characters
Fairies and sprites in popular culture
Fictional orphans
Fictional princesses
Female characters in fairy tales
Grimms' Fairy Tales
Love stories
Romance characters
Works by Charles Perrault
Articles containing video clips
ATU 500-559
False hero